The Canon New F-1 replaced the F-1n (an upgraded F-1) as Canon's top-of-the-line 35mm single-lens reflex camera in 1981.  Like the earlier models, the New F-1 takes FD-mount lenses. Although no date has ever been confirmed, it is thought that the last New F-1 was still being made in 1992. It was officially discontinued in 1994, and factory support ended in 2004.

The New F-1 is a manual-exposure camera capable of TTL full-aperture metering and stopped-down metering with the included Eye-Level Finder FN. Aperture-priority AE is available by attaching the optional AE Finder FN. Also, shutter-priority mode is optionally available when using either AE Motor Drive FN or AE Power Winder FN.

The New F-1 is an expandable system.  It consists of interchangeable viewfinders, focusing screens, motor drives, and alternate backs, all of which are specific to the New F-1.  All other Canon components, such as the FD lens series, close up accessories (bellows, extension tubes, etc.), and Canon A and T Speedlights (except the 300TL) are also compatible with the system.

Interchangeable viewfinders

The New F-1 system has 5 different viewfinders, which can be quickly and easily changed by depressing the two buttons on the rear of the finder, pulling it off the camera body, and pushing the new finder into place.
 Eye-Level Finder FN
 AE Finder FNThe Eye-Level and AE Finders are the basic eye-level prism finders, similar to most other SLR systems' prism finders.  Both include a hot shoe for on-camera flash, or attachments to remotely trigger the shutter.  Both also include an integral eyepiece shutter, which closes over the eyepiece to prevent light leakage during long exposures.When using the AE finder, setting the shutter speed dial to 'A' engages a small switch on the finder which puts the camera into aperture-priority auto exposure mode.  The normal meter display to the right of the through-the-lens (TTL) image disappears from the viewfinder, and a different meter display appears below the TTL image, which indicates which shutter speed the AE system has chosen.
 Speed Finder FNThe Speed Finder uses two separate prisms separated by a swivel, to allow either eye-level or waist-level viewing, and the ability to switch quickly between the two.  The optics are designed in such a way that the finder's image is visible up to 6 cm away from the eyepiece, enabling the photographer to use the finder even with glasses or goggles.  The Speed Finder also has a hot shoe.
 Waist-Level Finder FN
 Waist-Level Finder FN-6XBoth Waist-Level Finders are useful in situations which require use of a low angle, or for copy work, photomacrography, or astrophotography.  The image is reversed left-to-right in the finder.  The Waist-Level Finder FN has a collapsible barrel and a flip-up 4.6x magnifier, while the 6x model has a 6x magnified image, and an integral diopter adjustment.

Interchangeable focusing screens

The New F-1 system also has 13 different focusing screens, in a variety of metering modes (center-weighted averaging, selective-area, and spot, though not all are available with spot metering), for a total of 32 different screens.  The screens are named with a two-letter designation, the first indicating the metering type (A for averaging, P for area metering, and S for spot metering), and the second indicating the style of screen, as listed below.
 A - Standard Microprism (A, P)
 B - New Split (A, P, S)
 C - Overall Laser Matte (A, P, S)
 D - Laser Matte with Grid (A, P)
 E - New Split/Microprism (A, P, S)
 F - Microprism/Fast Lenses (A, P)
 G - Microprism/Slow Lenses (A, P)
 H - Laser Matte with Scale (A, P)
 I - Laser Matte with Double Cross-Hair Reticle (A, P, S)
 J - Bright Laser Matte/Short Lenses (A, P, S)
 K - Bright Laser Matte/Long Lenses (A, P, S)
 L - Cross Split (A, P)
 M - A/B Size Laser Matte (A, P)

The standard screen supplied from the factory in F-1 bodies is the Focusing Screen FN-AE (averaging metering, New Split/Microprism style) for bodies shipped with an AE finder FN, and FN-PE (partial metering, new split/microprism style) for bodies shipped with an Eye Level Finder FN.

Replacing a screen is a simple operation.  The finder is removed from the camera, and the screen is then pried up using a fingernail along the silver rear edge of the screen.  The new screen is pressed into place, and the finder put back on.

Automatic film advance

There are two different motorized film advance units in the New F-1 system:  the AE Power Winder FN, and the AE Motor Drive FN.  The AE Power Winder FN allows up to 2 frames per second (frame/s) in continuous mode, and the AE Motor Drive allows up to 5 frame/s in high-speed mode and 3.5 frame/s in low-speed mode.  Both units also have single-exposure mode, where only a single frame is exposed when the shutter release is held down.  Both units also have a second shutter release for vertical format shooting, and a subtractive frame counter. Only the AE Motor Drive FN has a motorized film rewind (therefore when using the AE Power Winder FN it is not necessary to remove the Rewind Coupler cover from the bottom of the camera).

The AE Power Winder FN is powered by 4 AA batteries, and is a single self-contained, unexpandable unit.  The AE Motor Drive FN is a more complete system, as it has 3 different battery packs to choose from:  the Battery Pack FN, the Ni-Cd Pack FN, and the High Power Ni-Cd Pack FN.  The Battery and High Power Ni-Cd packs will power the motor drive for up to 50 rolls of film, while the Ni-Cd pack provides power for up to 30 rolls.  The Battery Pack FN takes 12 AA batteries.  The two Ni-Cd packs have to be plugged into a charger to recharge them.  The High Power Ni-Cd pack will also power the camera body itself by replacing the camera's battery with Battery Cord C-FN.

Both units add the possibility of shutter-priority auto exposure mode by setting the lens's aperture ring to 'A'.  The aperture needle disappears from the meter display, and the meter needle indicates what aperture the AE system has selected.  Also, using either of the motor drive systems also enables use of electronic interval timers and remote shutter releases, both wired and wireless.

Interchangeable backs

The standard camera back is also interchangeable with a couple other units.  One is the Data Back FN, which has 3 dials with letters, numbers, and Roman numerals.  The left-hand dial is labeled "Year", and has a blank, 0-9, 82-93, I-X, and a-g; the middle dial is labeled "Month", and has a blank, 0-31, and A-G; the right-hand dial is labeled "Day", and has a blank, and 0-31.  The back imprints the dial settings onto the film for classification or dating purposes, either at the time of shutter release, or when the manual record button is pressed.

The Film Chamber FN-100 is a bulk film back which allows up to 100 exposures without reloading.  It requires use of the AE Motor Drive FN.

Special Editions

In addition to the standard version of the New F-1, Canon produced a few special editions of the camera.

Canon 50 years commemorative model
1983 Canon launched a commemorative model for its 50th anniversary. The model is a standard model with a golden Canon logo.

Swiss Post model
Canon delivered a few models for the Swiss Post with a fixed ALOS 35mm f/3.5 lens.

Los Angeles Olympics Edition

Canon was the official camera sponsor of the 1984 Summer Olympics and produced a commemorative edition of the New F-1 for the occasion.  This edition has gold instead of white for the 'Canon' and 'F-1' lettering on the camera, and a gold 1984 Summer Olympics emblem on the rewind side of the front. Both the AE Finder FN and Eye Level Finder FN were available. The Eye-level Finder FN Olympic editions are much more difficult to find now, presumably due to lower production compared to the AE Finder version.

New F-1 High Speed Motor Drive

Also constructed for the 1984 Summer Olympics was a high-speed camera for the sports photographers covering the event.  This followed on from Canon's previous attempt at a high-speed sports photography camera, the F-1 High Speed Motor Drive camera, produced for the 1972 Winter Olympics held in Sapporo, Japan.  This new camera attained a record 14 frames per second performance, achieved through the use of a fixed pellicle mirror instead of the normal moving mirror, a high-speed metal blade shutter, and a large and powerful motor unit and battery pack.  It is estimated that under a hundred of these specialised cameras were constructed.

U.S. Navy model

Canon supplied a number of New F-1 cameras to the U.S. Navy.  These were largely identical to the civilian models except for Navy markings.

In popular culture

In the 2002 film Spider-Man, Peter Parker is seen using the camera the moment he gets bitten by the radioactive spider. The camera also makes an appearance in the following two films in the franchise.

References

External links
 Canon Inc. New F-1.  Retrieved from Canon's online Camera Museum on October 21, 2005.
 Review of Canon New F1. Retrieved 26 November 2015.
 Photography in Malaysia (2001). Modern Classic SLRs Series: Canon New F-1.  Retrieved on October 21, 2005.
 Canon Inc. (1981), Canon F-1.  Japan.  Canon publication C-CE-127T 1086N20.
 Canon Inc., The New F-1 World Book.  Retrieved 20 February 2006.
 CanonFD.com, archive of Canon FD-related manuals and brochures.

F-1
Products introduced in 1981